Mostafa MA Matin (1 August 1938 – 27 February 2004) is a Awami League politician and the former member of parliament for Mymensingh-18.

Career
Matin was elected to parliament from Mymensingh-18 as an Awami League candidate in 1973. He contested and lost the parliamentary elections in 1991 from Mymensingh-11.

On 22 January 2022, Matin was awarded the Ekushey Padak, the second most important award for civilians in Bangladesh.

References

Awami League politicians
2004 deaths
1st Jatiya Sangsad members
1938 births
Recipients of the Ekushey Padak